Aílton dos Santos Ferraz, sometimes known as just Aílton (born January 19, 1966), is a retired association footballer who played as an attacking midfielder for several Série A clubs.

Career
Born in Rio de Janeiro, Aílton Ferraz started his professional career playing with Flamengo. With Flamengo he played 116 Série A games and scored five goals between 1985 and 1991. He won the Campeonato Carioca in 1985, 1986 and 1987, the Taça Guanabara in 1988 and in 1989, the Taça Rio in 1985 and in 1986 the Série A in 1987, and the Copa do Brasil in 1990 with the club.

He left Flamengo in 1991 to play with Guarani, joining Kashiwa Reysol of Japan in 1993 and returning to Brazil in 1995 to defend Fluminense. He helped the club win the Campeonato Carioca in 1995. He was part of the Grêmio squad that won the 1996 Série A. After playing for several different clubs, he retired in 2002 while defending Uberlândia.

He began his coaching career in 2007 as America's head coach. After commanding weaker teams, such as Cabofriense, Volta Redonda and Duque de Caxias, he was invited by Jorginho to be his assistant coach, where he stayed in Goiás, Figueirense, and Flamengo.

Honors

Player
Flamengo
 Campeonato Brasileiro Série A:  1987
 Copa do Brasil:  1990
 Campeonato Carioca: 1986, 1991
 Copa Rio: 1991

Fluminense
 Campeonato Carioca: 1995

Grêmio
 Campeonato Brasileiro Série A: 1996
 Recopa Sudamericana: 1996
 Campeonato Gaúcho: 1996

Botafogo
 Campeonato Carioca: 1997

Remo
Campeonato Paraense: 1999

Manager
Resende
 Copa Rio: 2015

References

1966 births
Living people
Footballers from Rio de Janeiro (city)
Brazilian footballers
Brazilian football managers
Brazilian expatriate footballers
Expatriate footballers in Japan
Association football midfielders
Campeonato Brasileiro Série A players
Campeonato Brasileiro Série B managers
Campeonato Brasileiro Série C managers
Campeonato Brasileiro Série D managers
CR Flamengo footballers
Guarani FC players
Kashiwa Reysol players
Fluminense FC players
Grêmio Foot-Ball Porto Alegrense players
Botafogo de Futebol e Regatas players
Associação Atlética Ponte Preta players
Associação Desportiva Cabofriense players
Clube do Remo players
União São João Esporte Clube players
Paraná Clube players
Uberlândia Esporte Clube players
America Football Club (RJ) managers
Associação Desportiva Cabofriense managers
Volta Redonda Futebol Clube managers
Resende Futebol Clube managers
Duque de Caxias Futebol Clube managers
Audax Rio de Janeiro Esporte Clube managers
Tupi Football Club managers
Brasiliense Futebol Clube managers
Associação Atlética Portuguesa (RJ) managers